Operation Hametz (Mivtza Hametz) was a Jewish operation towards the end of the British Mandate of Palestine, as part of the 1948 Palestine war. It was launched at the end of April 1948 with the objective of capturing villages inland from Jaffa and establishing a blockade around the town. The operation, which led to the first direct battle between the British and the Irgun, was seen as a great victory for the latter, and enabled the Irgun to take credit for the complete conquest of Jaffa that happened on May 13.

Background
 
Hours after the UN resolution to partition Palestine into Jewish and Arab states, sniper fire was exchanged by both Jewish and Arab fighters between Jaffa and Tel Aviv. In the ensuing 5 months, while the British officially maintained the Mandate, these attacks led to the deaths of over 1,000 inhabitants of Tel Aviv according to the testimony of Yoseph Nachmias, an Irgun regular and explosives expert. During the same time, 30,000 people left Jaffa, leaving a population of between 50,000 and 60,000.

The operation

On the morning of 25 April 1948 the Irgun (a Jewish paramilitary group) launched a full-scale attack on Jaffa from Tel Aviv. Israeli historians maintain that the Haganah (another Jewish paramilitary group from which the Irgun had split off) had no prior warning of the attack but soon after its start the Haganah and the Irgun came to an agreement whereby the Irgun troops would be under the command of local Haganah commanders. The Irgun offensive included a continuous three-day mortar bombardment of the town centre. The operation involved attacks from the north by the Alexandroni Brigade and by the Givati Brigade from the south. They met little or no resistance. The Irgun captured the neighborhood of Menashiya. The Kiryati Brigade failed in its assault on the southern Jaffa suburb of Tel al-Rish.

According to LeBor on the attack on Jaffa:

The offensive alarmed the British. Jewish forces had just captured the Arab areas of Haifa, and as a result, the British government feared for its position in the Middle East, worrying that the Arabs would develop greater antagonism against the British. The British Army was concerned that increased Arab hostility would endanger British troops - British forces were by then evacuating Palestine, and as they used routes that passed through Arab-populated territory, it was feared that withdrawing units could be attacked.  British Foreign Secretary Ernest Bevin, upon hearing the news of the start of the offensive, ordered that Jewish forces be prevented from capturing Jaffa, or, if they did capture it, to be immediately driven out. Within hours of the start of the assault on Jaffa, William Fuller, the British district commissioner for Lydda, asked Israel Rokach, the mayor of Tel Aviv, to call off the attack. Throughout the following two days, Fuller continued asking Rokach to have the attack called off, warning that the British Army would intervene. The British rejected Arab demands to allow Arab Legion units to enter Palestine to defend Jaffa. However, they rushed four battalions of infantry, armor, and naval commandos to Palestine. These reinforcements were meant to free up units already in Palestine to deploy to Jaffa. On 28 April, the British, through Rokach, issued an ultimatum, demanding that Irgun forces cease fire and immediately withdraw from Menashiya, threatening to bomb Tel Aviv, and warning that they would "save Jaffa for the Arabs at all costs, especially in light of the fact that the Jews had conquered Haifa". Irgun rejected the demands. On the same day, the British began a show of force to deter the Jewish assault. Infantry and armor entered Jaffa, with British deploying a total of 4,500 troops in the town. Royal Navy destroyers cruised up and down the Palestinian coast, and Royal Air Force warplanes overflew southern Tel Aviv and Jaffa.

Though most British action was merely demonstrative, they did take limited action. A four-plane formation of Spitfires attacked a Haganah position in Bat Yam, and British artillery and tanks shelled Irgun positions in Menashiya. When the shells failed to dislodge the Irgun, British armor pushed into the city. However, the Irgun resisted; one tank was destroyed by a bazooka team, the Irgun blew up buildings that collapsed into the streets as the armor advanced, and Irgun men climbed onto the tanks and tossed live dynamite sticks into them. The British withdrew, leaving Irgun in control of Menashiya.

Following the battle, the British then sent an ultimatum to David Ben-Gurion, threatening to bomb Tel Aviv if he did not rein in the Irgun. As a response, the Irgun threatened to use its mortars to shell the American–German Colony in Jaffa, and declared that it was up to the British whether their departure from Palestine - already in its finishing stage - would be peaceful or bloody.

On 29 April, British commanders met with Ben-Gurion's son Amos and Jaffa mayor Yousef Haikal. An agreement was worked out, under which Operation Hametz would be stopped and the Haganah would not attack Jaffa until the end of the Mandate. The British dropped the demand for a complete withdrawal of Jewish forces from Menashiya, and only demanded control of the police station and road access to it. Rather than responding to the British demands, the Irgun blew up the police station as well as several houses, using the debris to block the very road that the British had demanded access to. Afterwards, the Irgun command declared that it was ready to hand over its positions in Menashiya to the Haganah.

On 30 April, the fighting finally came to an end. Jaffa would eventually fall on May 13, when Haganah forces entered the city.

Aftermath
By 30 April there were about 15,000 to 25,000 people left in Jaffa. The Haganah had complete control of all access into and out of the town, with the exception of a British army 'presence' at Yazur. They were allowing people to leave the town but subject to searches for weapons. The British army was escorting civilians to Lydda and al-Ramle. David Ben-Gurion recorded in his diary that when he visited Salama on the evening of 30 April all he found was 'only one old blind woman.' Most of the villages were systematically levelled in the following weeks.

The operation was the largest in the history of the Irgun. Because the Irgun had captured and held Menashiya on its own, just a few hundred meters from Jaffa, it was able to claim much of the credit for the later conquest of Jaffa.

Arab communities captured during Operation Hametz

See also
 Depopulated Palestinian locations in Israel

References

Bibliography
 Walid Khalidi, All That Remains, . Uses 1945 census for population figures.
 Benny Morris, The Birth of the Palestinian refugee problem, 1947–1949, .

Hametz
Haganah
April 1948 events in Asia